Luke Williams (born May 17, 1983) is an American soccer player.

Career

College
Williams grew up in Boerne, Texas, and played college soccer at Westmont College. During his college years he also played with Cascade Surge in the USL Premier Development League.

Professional
Undrafted out of college, Williams signed with expansion team Cleveland City Stars in the USL Second Division in 2007. He made his professional debut on April 28, 2007, in Cleveland's inaugural game against Cincinnati Kings, and scored his first career goal on June 16, 2007 in a 4-0 win over the Western Mass Pioneers. He made 33 appearances in total for the Stars, helping the team to the USL Second Division title in 2008, before moving to the Charlotte Eagles in 2009.

Personal
Luke is married to Jane Williams of Elevation Church. Jane is also writer and creator of Elevation Worship hits such as O Sing, Let It Shine, and the ever-loved Running.

References

External links
 Charlotte Eagles bio
 Cleveland City Stars bio

Living people
1983 births
American soccer players
Cascade Surge players
Charlotte Eagles players
Cleveland City Stars players
USL Second Division players
USL League Two players
USL Championship players
People from Boerne, Texas
Soccer players from Texas
Sportspeople from Waco, Texas
Association football forwards